Roshanara Garden is a Mughal-era garden built by Roshanara Begum, the second daughter of the Mughal emperor Shah Jahan. It is situated in Shakti Nagar near Kamla Nagar Clock Tower and North Campus of University of Delhi. It is one of the biggest gardens in Delhi having a great variety of plants, some imported from Japan. The lake inside the garden is visited by migratory birds during winters and is a popular site for bird watching.

The garden has a raised canal with flowering plants on both sides. Today the garden holds a white marble pavilion built in memory of princess Roshanara, who died in 1671 and was buried there. The elite Roshanara Club, which was started here in 1922 by the British is spread over 22 acres. Since 1927 first class cricket is played at the Roshanara Club Ground, which now boasts floodlights. The club is considered the birthplace of the Board of Control for Cricket in India (BCCI). Post Independence cricket administrators gathered in front of an old fireplace and sowed the seeds of the Indian cricket body.

History 
The garden and the tomb within were constructed by Roshanara Begum beginning in 1650. Her tomb is the only structure that remains of the garden's original appearance.

This garden was the Gift of Roshanara Begam, daughter of the Mughal Emperor Shah Jahan.

Transport
It is serviced by the Pul Bangash metro station on the Red Line of Delhi Metro. It is situated close to National Highway 1 on the Grand Trunk Road.

See also 
 Lal Bangla in Delhi, mausoleum of Lal Kunwar, the mother of Shah Alam II (1759-1806), and his daughter Begum Jaan.
Lal Darwaza, the northern gate of the outer walls of the Delhi of Sher Shah Suri. Also Known as Khooni Darwaza.

References

External links

The Herbert Offen Research Collection of the Phillips Library at the Peabody Essex Museum 

Mughal gardens in India
Tourist attractions in Delhi
North Delhi district
Monuments of National Importance in Delhi